Dumuli (also Romanized as Dūmūlī; also known as Domūlī and Dūmūlū) is a village in Angut-e Gharbi Rural District, Anguti District, Germi County, Ardabil Province, Iran. At the 2006 census, its population was 187, in 36 families.

References 

Tageo

Towns and villages in Germi County